Renger is both a surname and a given name. Notable people with the name include:

Annemarie Renger (1919–2008), German politician
Thomas Renger (born 1972), German sitting volleyball player
Renger van der Zande (born 1986), Dutch racing driver

See also
Albert Renger-Patzsch (1897–1966), German photographer